Heyward Hutson (born January 24, 1936) is an American politician and retired military officer who served in the South Carolina House of Representatives from 1993 to 1996 and again from 2007 to 2008.

Early life and education 
Hutson was born in Summerville, South Carolina. He earned a Bachelor of Science degree from the United States Military Academy and a Master of Arts from Syracuse University.

Career 
Hutson was a member of the United States Army from 1958 to 1985. During his military service, Hutson served in the Vietnam War and was twice deployed to Europe. After retiring from active duty, Hutson served as an advisor in the United States Department of Defense. Hutson worked as an advisor to the Chief of Staff of the United States Army, and was later selected to serve as policy planning assistant in the Office of the Coordinator of Inter-American Affairs.

In 1992, Hutson was elected to the South Carolina House of Representatives, serving until 1996. He was defeated for re-election by Converse Chellis In 2007, he was re-elected to the House after the resignation of Chellis, who was appointed to serve as the Treasurer of South Carolina. In 2008, Hutson was defeated for election to a full term by Jenny Horne. Since leaving office, Hutson has served as the president of the Summerville Preservation Society.

Personal life 
Hutson and his wife, Evelyn, have four children.

References 

Living people
1936 births
People from Summerville, South Carolina
United States Military Academy alumni
Syracuse University alumni
Republican Party members of the South Carolina House of Representatives